Glue is the debut studio album by British indie rock band, Eugene + the Lizards, though the second overall by frontman Eugene McGuinness, released on 30 November 2009 through Domino Records.

It was originally released as a 6-track limited edition 10" vinyl record, which then came with a digital code to download all 6 tracks plus the additional 4 tracks online for free, though it is now available for normal digital download on iTunes and AmazonMp3 and Domino mart.

Track listing

References

2009 albums
Domino Recording Company albums